Inertia is the name of two separate but related fictional superheroes appearing in American comic books published by Marvel Comics.

Various incarnations of Inertia
The first Inertia was a character from Earth-712 (the world of the faux JLA characters known as the Squadron Supreme).  Like most of the newer characters created for the Squadron Supreme mini-series, Inertia's counterpart in the Detroit Justice League was Vixen.  Her powers were based on the use of kinetic energy against the enemy.  The second Inertia was a member of the rebooted Squadron Supreme, from the Supreme Power universe, also known as Earth-31916.

Inertia (Squadron Supreme)

Fictional character biography
Edith Freiberg had the power to absorb and redirect kinetic energy (motion).  After being recruited by Nighthawk to the team of superpowered "Redeemers", she was one of the Redeemers who joined the Squadron Supreme's "Utopia Program" in hopes of stopping it. Inertia was then revealed to have joined the Squadron Supreme as a double agent. During her time in the Squadron Supreme, she developed a romantic relationship with Haywire. Alongside Nighthawk's Redeemers, she attacked the Squadron Supreme. During the encounter, she battled Power Princess, but was defeated by Doctor Spectrum.

Alongside the Squadron Supreme, Professor Imam, and Master Menace, Inertia attacked the Nth Man, a universe-absorbing entity that was encroaching into the Earth-712 universe. Inertia died after an attempt to use her powers against the Nth Man backfired, as he was too large an entity for her to absorb the kinetic energy from, and her body was overloaded by a surge of energy that caused her to disperse in a pink haze.

Powers and abilities
Inertia had the ability to transfer "inertia" (actually momentum) from one person or object to another.

Inertia (Supreme Power) 
Edith Freiberg is a lesbian Army private, first introduced in Squadron Supreme: High Command where she is seen trashing a bar and attacking several men (using her powers to redirect kinetic energy) before being introduced to the public as part of the Squadron Supreme. She is portrayed as having problems with men and with authority and in issue #4, her back story is fleshed out.

Edith's father was the head of an ultra-conservative church and a highly prejudiced and abusive man. Her powers manifested at a young age when a nurse trying to give her a vaccination could not get the needle through her skin. Her father believed this was a sign of demonic power and, unable to hurt 'Eddy', would beat her mother for any of Edith's perceived transgressions.

In high school, she was attacked by three boys (her classmates). While she could easily have defended herself, Edith was aware that this would only result in her mother receiving a beating and so did not attempt to defend herself. The stress of this event and her inability to use her powers when she most needed to left her in a catatonic state for some time. Despite this, her father refused to believe she had been beaten (citing the lack of injury), instead accusing her of being promiscuous.

Edith's mother soon discovered that her husband was having an affair and confronted him. Edith's father accidentally caused a car accident that killed Edith's mother and attempted to cover up the event to save his reputation. Edith recovered after hearing the news, finding and killing her father—then killing the boys who had raped her.

During 'Operation Long Walk' (the Squadron's mission in the Middle East), Edith finds a young girl whose mother and older sister were beaten and then stoned to death by four male relatives on the pretext of erasing the shame of the rape ("honor killing"). The girl had apparently been hiding to avoid a similar fate. Using Emil Burbank as a translator, Edith finds the relatives and buries them up to their necks. She then tears a steel bar off a nearby railing, gives it to the girl, and walks away. The girl apparently kills them.

So far, her behavior has been shown to be erratic and possibly psychotic. Stanley Stewart (The Blur) has attempted to reach out to her, and Edith has thanked him for his concern, but she still refuses his offer of friendship.

References

External links
Marvel Heroes Classic Roleplaying Game page on Inertia
Marvel.com page on Inertia

Characters created by Mark Gruenwald
Comics characters introduced in 1986
Fictional lesbians
Marvel Comics characters with superhuman strength
Marvel Comics female superheroes
Marvel Comics LGBT superheroes
Squadron Supreme